Milica Despina (– 30 January 1554) was the Princess consort of Wallachia by marriage to Neagoe Basarab. She was regent of Wallachia from 1521 to 1522, on the behalf of her son Teodosie of Wallachia. In later years, she became a nun, and took the name Platonida.

Life
Princess Milica Despina was of Serbian origin, and closely related to noble houses of Branković and Lazarević. In historiography, there are several theories about her parents. Some scholars think that she was one of the daughters of Serbian despot Jovan Branković who died in 1502. Others think that she was daughter of John's elder brother, Serbian despot Đorđe Branković who died in 1516. There is also some other views about her origin.

Issue
Milica Despina and Neagoe Basarab had six children:
 Teodosie of Wallachia 
 Stana of Wallachia married to Stephen IV of Moldavia
 Petru
 Ioan
 Roxanda (Ruxandra) of Wallachia married to Radu of Afumați, and later to Radu Paisie
 Angelina (Anghelina) of Wallachia

References

Literature

 I. C. Filitti, "Despina, princesse de Valachie, fille présumée de Jean Brankovitch", Revista istorică română, I (3), București 1931, 241–250. 
 I. R. Mircea, P. Ş. Năsturel, "De l'ascendance de Despina, épouse du voévode Neagoe Basarab", Romanoslavica, X, București 1964, 435–437.
 C. Nicolescu, "Princesses Serbes sur le trône des Principautes Roumanies", Зборник за ликовне уметности, 5, Нови Сад 1969, 95–117.

1554 deaths
16th-century women rulers
16th-century Romanian people
Royal consorts of Wallachia
Regents and governors of Wallachia
Year of birth unknown
Year of birth uncertain
16th-century Serbian royalty
Branković dynasty
Women of medieval Wallachia
16th-century Serbian women
16th-century Romanian women